Amara Maple, known professionally as Lana Rhoades, is an American podcaster, social-media personality, and former pornographic film actress. Throughout her career, she has appeared in publications such as Hustler, Penthouse, and Playboy.

Early life
Rhoades was raised by a single mother in a suburb of Chicago.

Career
Rhoades began her professional adult film career in April 2016, when she was 19 years old. She left the professional industry by late 2017. In 2017, Rhoades publicly accused director Pierre Woodman of coercing her into performing acts she did not want to during a shoot, and she also said that he allegedly admitted to her to violating another woman's rights. She has continued to be open about exploitation and abuse in the porn industry. Later that year, Rhoades was dismissed from LA Direct Models, her representative agency, after an incident involving another performer. She stated in an interview with The Skinny Confidential that she didn't believe the adult film industry should exist because most of the scenes she was involved in were false. She also added that she considered herself "pretty asexual" and has no attraction to other people.

In 2019, Rhoades was the most searched actress on Pornhub, garnering 345 million views. In February 2020, Rhoades was hired by Brazzers as a marketing consultant. That November, Ellen von Unwerth directed her photoshoot for the cover of Playboy.

In 2021, she began to promote the cryptocurrency PAWGcoin, and developed an NFT image project in November of that year which was launched in 2022. After the launch, she transferred out 509 ethereum (ETH) worth $1.5m, abandoning her NFT project following the $1.8m launch, according to internet investigator Coffeezilla.

Rhoades co-hosts the podcast 3 Girls 1 Kitchen and has designed a lingerie line with Yandy. She has also focused on expanding her social media accounts, with her Instagram having over 16 million followers.

Personal life
Rhoades has a son, born in early 2022. According to Rhoades, the child's father is an NBA player who told her to "go to hell" when she informed him she was pregnant.

References

External links 

 
 

21st-century American actresses
American pornographic film producers
Living people
Pornographic film actors from Illinois
Year of birth missing (living people)
Place of birth missing (living people)